Edward Nicholson may refer to:
Edward Max Nicholson (1904–2003), founder of World Wildlife Fund
Edward Nicholson (librarian), British author and Bodley's Librarian
Ed Nicholson (1923–1987), Canadian ice hockey player

See also
Edward Nicolson (born 1964), English cricketer